Ray is the soundtrack of the 2004 film Ray starring Jamie Foxx (who won the Academy Award for Best Actor for his role as "Ray Charles" in this film), Kerry Washington, Terrence Howard, Clifton Powell and Regina King. The score was composed by Breyon Prescott and Craig Armstrong.

The album won a Grammy Award and was nominated for the BAFTA Award for Best Film Music.

Track listing 
"Mess Around" – 2:41
"I've Got a Woman" – 2:52
"Hallelujah I Love Her So" (Live) – 3:05
"Drown in My Own Tears" – 3:21
"(Night Time Is) The Right Time" – 3:24
"Mary Ann" – 2:47
"Hard Times (No One Knows Better Than I)" – 2:55
"What'd I Say" (Live) – 4:38
"Georgia on My Mind" – 3:39
"Hit the Road Jack" – 2:00
"Unchain My Heart" – 2:50
"I Can't Stop Loving You" (Live) – 3:17
"Born to Lose" – 3:15
"Bye Bye Love" – 2:11
"You Don't Know Me" (Live) – 3:16
"Let the Good Times Roll" (Live) – 2:48
"Georgia on My Mind" (Live) – 5:30
Total Time: 54:28

A second CD, More Music from Ray, featuring more music from the film along with "music that inspired the film", was released on Atlantic Records.

Charts

Weekly charts

Year-end charts

Certifications and sales

References

2004 soundtrack albums
Biographical film soundtracks
Rhino Entertainment soundtracks
Grammy Award for Best Compilation Soundtrack for Visual Media